Razorback is a 1984 Australian natural horror film written by Everett De Roche, based on Peter Brennan's 1981 novel, and directed by Russell Mulcahy. The film revolves around the attacks of a gigantic wild boar terrorising the Australian outback, killing and devouring people. The film was released November 2, 1984.

Plot
Jake Cullen is babysitting his grandson at his house in the Australian outback when a massive razorback boar smashes through his house and carries off his grandson to devour. Jake is accused of murdering the child, and while his account of the events are met with considerable scepticism, he is ultimately acquitted due to lack of evidence. The event destroys his credibility, however, and he vows revenge on the boar.

Two years later, American wildlife reporter Beth Winters  journeys to the outback to document the hunting of Australian wildlife to be processed into pet food at a run-down factory. Beth gets video footage of two thugs, Benny Baker and his brother Dicko, illegally making pet food and is subsequently chased down by them by car. They catch up, force her off the road and attempt to rape her only to be chased off by the same boar that killed Jake's grandson. Beth attempts to take shelter in her car, but the hog rips off the door, drags her out and eats her. With no witnesses, her disappearance is subsequently ruled an accident by having fallen down an abandoned mine shaft after leaving her wrecked car.

Some time later, Beth's husband Carl travels to Australia in search of her and encounters Jake, whom Beth interviewed during her initial report. Jake refers Carl to the local cannery, where he meets Benny and Dicko. He pretends to be a Canadian visitor and convinces them to take him along on their next kangaroo hunt, only to be abandoned by them when he spoils a potential kill. Carl is then attacked by a herd of wild pigs, spurred on by the giant boar, which chase him through the night and force him to take shelter atop a windmill. The next morning the pigs knock over the windmill, but Carl is saved by landing in a pond at the windmill's base, which the pigs fear to enter.

Once the pigs leave, Carl attempts to make his way back to civilization, all the while suffering from dehydration-induced hallucinations, before finally reaching the house of Sarah Cameron: a friend of Jake who has been studying the local pig population and the only person who believes his story of the giant razorback. While recovering, Carl learns from Sarah that something has been causing the wild pigs excess stress, leading them into unusual behaviour, such as increased aggression and cannibalising their own young. Meanwhile, after learning that Carl had seen the razorback, Jake sets out for the pumping station and manages to shoot it with one of Sarah's tracking darts. He also finds Beth's wedding ring in the boar's faeces, which he returns to a grieving Carl.

Benny and Dicko overhear a radio conversation suggesting that Jake knows what really happened to Beth Winters. Fearful that Jake is attempting to implicate them in her death, Benny and Dicko attack Jake at his camp, breaking his legs with bolt-cutters and leaving him to be killed by the razorback. His remains are later found by Sarah and Carl, along with marks in the dirt made by Dicko's cleaver. Realising that the brothers were responsible for both Beth and Jake's death, Carl attacks Benny at the brothers' lair, interrogating him by dangling him over a mine shaft before dropping him into it. As Sarah rounds up a posse to hunt down the razorback, Carl corners Dicko at the cannery when the razorback suddenly appears and mauls Dicko to death. The razorback then chases Carl into the factory, when Sarah arrives and is seemingly killed by the boar.

The boar continues to pursue Carl, and in its maddened rampage, the razorback ends up damaging the cannery's generator, which sends the machines running. Carl lures the boar onto a conveyor belt that throws it into a giant meat grinder, chopping it to pieces. After shutting down the machinery, Carl finds and rescues Sarah, who had merely been knocked unconscious, and the two embrace.

Cast

Production
Razorback was directed by Russell Mulcahy and mostly shot in Broken Hill, New South Wales. Director of photography Dean Semler was hired on the strength of his work in Mad Max 2. Some commentators have written that the film may have been inspired by the 1980 death of Azaria Chamberlain, whose mother was accused of murder after a dingo snatched the infant.

The razorback boar was an animatronic. Effects man Bob McCarron designed a total of six boars for the film, one of them designed to ram vehicles. The shoot used one of the first batches of a new fast film stock developed by Kodak, which resulted in quite high-resolution shots. Mulcahy originally considered Jeff Bridges for the role of Carl, but producer Hal McElroy considered he had too little international appeal.

Although Arkie Whiteley initially signed on for a shower scene in this movie, a week before it meant to be filmed she backed out, claiming that she was not ready to do a nude scene. It was up to designer and make-up man Bob McCarron to convince her to change her mind. For this he took an unusual tactic. As he learned that she was determined not to appear nude, McCarron then hired a body double to appear in the nude scene. When next speaking to Whitely he let slip that he had seen the body double naked to make sure she was right for the shoot. Whitely was curious and asked what the actress was like. McCarron said she was fine but there was a slight cellulite problem around the hips. Whitley then decided that rather than be mistaken for such, she would do the nude scene herself.

Release
Razorback was released in Australia on 19 April 1984, and grossed $801,000 at the box office. The film was given a limited release theatrically in the United States by Warner Bros. in November. 1984. It grossed $150,140 at the box office in the United States.

Following various VHS video releases, the film was issued on DVD in Australia by Umbrella Entertainment on 21 September 2005. It was presented in 2.40:1 widescreen with a 5.1 Dolby Digital soundtrack and the original 2.0 Dolby Stereo soundtrack. Special features included the 70-minute featurette "Jaws on Trotters"; an audio interview with actor Gregory Harrison; four brief pre-release deleted scenes with extra gore, sourced from VHS tape; a photo gallery; and an original theatrical trailer.

Razorback was subsequently released on DVD in various other countries, including the US, UK, France and Germany, though they only contain varying quantities of the Australian disc's extras. The US release was by Warner Home Video, as part of the Warner Archive Collection, and only contains 2.0 stereo audio and the theatrical trailer.

In 2014, Umbrella Entertainment released the film on Blu-ray with all of the prior DVDs extras and an additional 84 minutes of cast and crew interviews. The disc featured a remastered HD transfer.

In August, 2018, Umbrella Entertainment released a newly remastered edition Blu-Ray featuring a 4k transfer of the theatrical cut and a VHS-sourced version of the uncut film. In addition to porting over all previous supplements, newly produced extras include an audio commentary by director Russell Mulcahy and the retrospective "A Certain Piggish Nature: Looking Back at Razorback."

Reception
Razorback received mixed reviews from critics, with several critics comparing the film to Steven Spielberg's  Jaws.

Empire Magazine awarded the film two out of five stars, writing, "The oddball nightmare style is effective but the prop pig and under par acting let the film down." TV Guide also gave the film two out of five stars, commending the film's cinematography, but stated that the film was "too repetitive (and sometimes simply too silly) to be truly engaging".
Variety gave the film a positive review, writing, "The plot may be a bit familiar, but Razorback is no quickie: it’s an extremely handsome production, beautifully shot by Dean Semler."

Accolades

See also
Boar
Cinema of Australia

References

External links

Razorback at Oz Movies
Razorback at the National Film and Sound Archive
 
 Razorback at Australian Screen Online
 

1984 films
1984 horror films
1980s action horror films
Australian horror films
Australian action horror films
1980s English-language films
Fictional pigs
Films about pigs
Films directed by Russell Mulcahy
Films set in Australia
Films shot in Australia
Warner Bros. films
Australian natural horror films
Australian monster movies